Frosty Treats, Inc. v. Sony Computer Entertainment America, Inc., 426 F.3d 1001 (8th Cir. 2005), is a trademark case in which the United States Court of Appeals for the Eighth Circuit held that the name of one of the largest ice cream truck franchise companies in the United States was neither distinctive nor famous enough to receive protection against being used in a violent video game.

Background
Frosty Treats, Inc. is the name of "one of the largest ice cream truck street vendors" in the United States. Their trucks uniformly feature a "Frosty Treats" logo, typically surrounded by the logos of various frozen snacks sold by the vender. Another feature of the trucks is the "Safety Clown", an image of a clown pointing children towards the back of the vehicle. In the mid 1990s, Sony released Twisted Metal 2, a video game that allows players to wreak havoc on simulated streets with a variety of vehicles - including an ice cream truck prominently featuring a logo that says "Frosty Treats". The video game ice cream truck is driven by a crazed clown known as Sweet Tooth, one of many featured in the game.

Lawsuit
Frosty Treats, Inc. filed a lawsuit against Sony contending that the game infringed on the company's trademarks through the use of the phrase, "Frosty Treats", as well as similarities between the video game clown and the company's own safety clown. The U.S. District Court for the Western District of Missouri granted summary judgment to Sony and dismissed the case, holding that the name could not be protected because it was generic. U.S. District Judge Scott Wright stated in his May 19, 2005 dismissal that "the various depictions of the Sweet Tooth character in defendant's Twisted Metal games and plaintiff's Safety Clown are so dissimilar that no reasonable trier of fact could conclude that they are confusingly similar." Additionally, the court noted that the safety clown could not be protected because it was functional; it directed children to cross behind the van rather than in front of it. Frosty Treats appealed the dismissal to the Eighth Circuit Court of Appeals on June 15, 2005.

Opinion of the Eighth Circuit Court of Appeals
The Eighth Circuit affirmed the dismissal, holding that the name was indeed generic. Judge Morris S. Arnold wrote that, although the Eighth Circuit rejected the finding that the safety clown was functional, they held that it nonetheless lacked distinctiveness in the marketplace such that it would merit protection. Furthermore, the Court noted such striking dissimilarities between the company's clown and the game clown that no consumer would be likely to confuse the two.

References

External links
 

United States Court of Appeals for the Eighth Circuit cases
United States trademark case law
2005 in United States case law
Sony litigation
Video game controversies
Ice cream vans
Twisted Metal